Sara Pinto Coelho (1913 in Portuguese São Tomé and Príncipe – 1990 in Portugal) was a writer of fiction, plays and children's literature in the Portuguese language.

She was born in Roça Esperança, a hamlet in the island of Príncipe and was daughter of Manuel dos Santos e Abreu Jr. and Maria Sarah de Lima.  She lived the majority of her adulthood in Mozambique where she was a primary school teacher.

She wrote theatrical plays for the radio, novels, short stories and children's books. She was director of a theatrical program on Rádio Clube de Moçambique from 1967 to 1972.

She later married Judge José Augusto de Vasconcelos Pinto Coelho, native of Mondim de Basto, Casa do Balcão and was mother of the journalist Carlos Pinto Coelho.

She died in Praia de Miramar in 1990.

Books
 Confidências de Duas Raparigas Modernas (1946)
 O Tesouro Maravilhoso (1947)
 Aventuras de um Carapau Dourado (1948)
 Memórias de uma Menina Velha (1994)

References

1913 births
1990 deaths
Mozambican women writers
São Tomé and Príncipe women writers
São Tomé and Príncipe women poets
São Tomé and Príncipe emigrants to Mozambique
People from Príncipe
Portuguese women novelists
São Tomé and Príncipe women short story writers
São Tomé and Príncipe short story writers
Women dramatists and playwrights
Portuguese women children's writers
Portuguese women poets
Portuguese radio presenters
Portuguese women radio presenters
20th-century Portuguese women writers
20th-century novelists
20th-century dramatists and playwrights
São Tomé and Príncipe novelists
São Tomé and Príncipe dramatists and playwrights
20th-century Portuguese writers
20th-century short story writers
Mozambican emigrants to Portugal